Lionel Grossain (born 12 February 1938) is a French judoka. He competed in the men's middleweight event at the 1964 Summer Olympics.

References

External links
 

1938 births
Living people
French male judoka
Olympic judoka of France
Judoka at the 1964 Summer Olympics
Place of birth missing (living people)